Avdelan, also rendered as Abdilan, may refer to:
 Avdelan-e Olya
 Avdelan-e Sofla